Noah Nicholas Emmerich (born February 27, 1965) is an American actor and director best known for his roles in films such as Beautiful Girls (1996), The Truman Show (1998), Frequency (2000), Miracle (2004), Little Children (2006) and Super 8 (2011). From 2013 to 2018 he starred as FBI agent Stan Beeman on the FX series The Americans, for which he won the Critics' Choice Television Award for Best Supporting Actor in a Drama Series in 2019.

Early life
Emmerich was born in New York City, New York. His mother, Constance, is a concert pianist; his father, André Emmerich (1924–2007), was a gallery owner and art dealer. Born in Frankfurt, Germany, André emigrated from Nazi Germany with his family, first to Amsterdam, Netherlands, then to New York in 1940. His aunt was classmate of Anne Frank's. Noah's family is Jewish, from Germany and France on his father's side and Hungary and Romania on his mother's. He has two older brothers: Toby Emmerich, a screenwriter and former chairman of the Warner Bros. Pictures Group; and Adam Emmerich, a partner at the law firm of Wachtell, Lipton, Rosen & Katz in New York, specializing in mergers and acquisitions.

Noah Emmerich attended the Dalton School and learned to play the trumpet as a youth. He privately studied the Meisner technique of acting under Ron Stetston, an actor/director who is currently a senior member of the acting staff at the Neighborhood Playhouse in New York City. He is a graduate of Yale University, where he majored in history. He sang in the "Yale Spizzwinks(?)" an a cappella singing group which also included actor Joshua Malina.

Career

Film
Emmerich had his first starring role in the film Beautiful Girls, which earned him positive reviews from audiences and critics. He had supporting roles in such movies as The Truman Show, Life and Frequency.

In the 2000s, Emmerich began starring in more dramatic films, such as Julie Johnson, Beyond Borders, Little Children, Pride and Glory. He played the main antagonist, Colonel Nelec, in J. J. Abrams's film Super 8, which earned positive reviews from critics and was a box office success. He played assistant coach Craig Patrick in the 2004 film Miracle. In 2016, Emmerich portrayed Bill Hammond in the Western Jane Got a Gun.

Television
Emmerich started his career doing guest roles in television series such as NYPD Blue and Melrose Place.

Beginning in the 2000s, he had more prominent guest roles on series such as Monk, White Collar and The Walking Dead, the last of which brought him a Saturn Award nomination. In 2021, he reprised the role in the series finale of The Walking Dead: World Beyond.

His most notable TV series role role was that of FBI Agent Stan Beeman on the FX series The Americans. The series earned positive reviews, and Emmerich earned a Critics' Choice Award nomination for his performance. It ran for six seasons, ending in May, 2018. Emmerich made his directorial debut on season 3's episode 7, "Walter Taffet", and also directed episode 5 of season 4.

In September 2019, he starred in Netflix's limited series The Spy as the Israeli Mossad recruiting agent Dan Peleg.

On October 23, 2019, it was announced that he was cast as Kick Grabaston in the Netflix comedy series Space Force.

Personal life
Emmerich was married to actress Melissa Fitzgerald from 1998 to 2003. On April 26, 2014, he married actress and producer Mary Regency Boies (daughter of prominent lawyers David and Mary Boies) at the Gramercy Park Hotel in New York. He lives in Greenwich Village in New York City.

He has two brothers, Warner Bros. Pictures chairman Toby Emmerich and Adam Emmerich.

Filmography

Film

Television

Director

Awards and nominations

References

External links
 

1965 births
Living people
20th-century American male actors
21st-century American male actors
American male film actors
American male television actors
American television directors
American people of German-Jewish descent
American people of Hungarian-Jewish descent
American people of Romanian-Jewish descent
Jewish American male actors
Male actors from New York City
Yale College alumni
21st-century American Jews